Kitwe is the third largest city in terms of infrastructure development (after Lusaka and Ndola) and second largest city in terms of size and population (after Lusaka) in Zambia. With a population of 517,543 (2010 census provisional) Kitwe is one of the most developed commercial and industrial areas in the nation, alongside Ndola and Lusaka. It has a complex of mines on its north-western and western edges.

Kitwe is located in the Copperbelt Province and is made up of townships and suburban areas including Parklands, Riverside, Buchi, Chimwemwe, Kwacha, Nkana East, Nkana West, Garneton, Ndeke, Miseshi, Wusakile, Mindolo, Chachacha and Race Course, to mention a few. The city is sometimes referred to as Kitwe-Nkana. Nkana is derived from the name of Senior Chief Nkana of the Lamba speaking people of the Copperbelt province. His area covers the towns of Kitwe, Mufulira, Kalulushi-Chibuluma and Chambishi.

Kitwe has both private and public schools which include Lechwe School, Mpelembe Secondary School, Kitwe Boys Secondary School, Parklands Secondary School, Mukuba Secondary School, Nkana Trust School and Helen Kaunda Secondary School. It is also home to Zambia's second highest learning institution, namely The Copperbelt University.

History
The name Kitwe comes from the Lamba word Ichitwe (a big head), because long before the industrialisation took place the inhabitants of this place the Lambas found a head of the dead elephant. The town of Kitwe is part of Chief Nkana's area. The Lambas were misplaced when the mining actitivities commenced in this part of the Lambaland in the 1930s.

Kitwe was founded in 1936 in north-central Zambia as the railway was being built by Cecil Rhodes' company. It was first established as an adjunct, non-mining-related but supportive part of an expanding copper-mining centre at Nkana. The expanding copper mines at Nkana made it the dominant centre in the region and Kitwe started building up its size and significance over the years, finally surpassing Nkana as the main centre. The Rhodesia Railways main line reached the town in 1937, providing passenger services as far south as Bulawayo in today's Zimbabwe, with connections to Cape Town in today's South Africa. The line was extended into DR Congo, and from there eventually linked to the Benguela Railway to the Atlantic port of Lobito in Angola, which used to take some of Zambia's copper exports but is currently closed.

With the upsurge of copper prices in the 1950s Kitwe developed from a small township to the second largest city in Zambia, obtaining city status in 1966. It then developed as an industrial and commercial area and later an important agricultural area. The good central position of the city in the Copperbelt area made it the most popular choice for industrial developers even today in the 2020s.

Mining

Kitwe is the base for a number of mining operations including the Mopani Copper Mines. Kitwe has rich
copper, cobalt and emerald deposits among other minerals. It is home to Mopani Copper Mine's Nkana Cobalt Plant, 
one of Africa's largest mines. The mine is located 1 km south west of Kitwe. 
Nkana cobalt mine is the deepest mine on the Zambian Copperbelt. It has two shafts below 1,300
meters and three open pits. The plant treats cobalt concentrates to produce high purity cobalt metal.
At Nkana, copper and cobalt ore is produced from five sources: four underground mines namely,
Mindola North Shaft, Mindola Sub Vertical Shaft, Central Shaft, South Ore Body (SOB) Shaft and
open pits dotted across the Nkana Oxide Cap.

The following is a list of Mining Companies in Kitwe (as of 2019),
Mopani Copper Mines Nkana Cobalt Plant
Konkola Copper Mines Copper Refining Plant
EC Mining
Grizzly Mining
Kagem Mining Ltd
African Mining Consultants
Sandvik Mining
AAC Mining Executors Ltd

Such a concentration of mining companies makes Kitwe the mining hub of Zambia

Manufacturing
Kitwe hosts a wide range of manufacturing companies and industrial organisations. The city manufactures a wide range of products like processed foods, steel, electrical and electronic, chemicals, engineering and many other products found in any industrial centre in the world. Notable companies include SCAW Limited, Piggot Maskew Limited, Monarch to name but a few.

Communications

Railway
Kitwe lies at the end of Zambia Railways' passenger services from Livingstone, Lusaka and Ndola, but freight lines continue to the mining towns to the north-west.

Road
The main highway through the Copperbelt (the T3 Highway) runs south-east to north-west through the city, to Ndola (as a dual carriageway) in the south-east, and to Chingola (as a dual carriageway) and Chililabombwe in the north-west. A laterite road (the M7 Road) goes west to Kalulushi and Kasempa.

Airport
Southdowns Airport lies about 12 km south-west of the town but does not receive many scheduled services. The airport was closed down for repair in 2005, and re-opened in 2008. Ndola Airport is 50 km south-east and services regular commercial flights from Lusaka, Solwezi, Addis Ababa, Nairobi, and Johannesburg.

Education

Schools
A student and teacher exchange programme was introduced in 1999 with teacher exchange visits by Kingsmead Community School in Wiveliscombe, England with two Kitwe schools – Helen Kaunda High School and Mukuba High School. This started a series of partnerships between Zambian schools such as Chamboli, Mukuba, Ndeke Secondary, Ndeke Basic, Kitwe Boys, Kitwe Basic, Wesely Nyerenda, Fatima, Nkana High, etc. and UK schools, and there are now over 30 such school partnerships. Students from Kingsmead paid a visit to the Kitwe schools in 2005. Kitwe has a number of private schools, six being:

Kitwe International School is a privately owned international school with a campus in Nkana West at plot 10, 9th Avenue, off Boma Street. It offers quality tuition in sciences and arts. It also offers tuition for degree programs especially to students studying by distance. It offers consultancy services in project proposals and dissertation writeup. The school became operational on 1 June 2012:

Lechwe School is one of the biggest schools in the city. An international school, it provides pre-school, primary, secondary, and advanced level teaching following a Cambridge curriculum. Lechwe school is a multi-cultural school, hence there is not much religious teaching but a large number of subject options in secondary and advanced level schooling. The school is known for having a good disciplinary policy and a number of extracurricular activities like chess, table tennis, volleyball, basketball, tennis, squash, rugby, hockey, football, cricket, athletics, swimming, softball, netball, handball, baseball, rounders, a Duke of Edinburgh program, and martial arts. Lechwe school is known for its students' abilities: swimmer Ellen Hight represented Zambia at the 2000 Summer Olympics, swimmers Andre and Ursula Kuenzli represented Zambia in the Commonwealth Games in England in July 2002, Jacob Mulenga main striker of the Zambian Football Team, and swimmer Jade Howard represented Zambia in the FINA World Championship. Eppa Tembo, a chess player, represented Zambia in 2008 World Championship.

Mpelembe Secondary School is one of the biggest secondary schools in the city and a preeminent secondary school. It offers Zambian Standard syllabus and Cambridge curriculum. Being one of the top 10 best schools in Zambia, Mpelembe has a highly selective admissions at both eighth and tenth grade entry levels. Each year, there are thousands of applicants and only about one hundred and fifty students are enrolled. Mpelembe has an A level program under the Cambridge Local Examination Syndicate. Students who meet the grades go on to study at universities in the UK, US, Canada, South Africa and other developed countries. The most popular Universities for Mpelembe Students are University of Manchester, Birmingham, UMIST, Imperial college, Leeds University. Camborne School of Mines is the default college for Mining Engineering students. Mpelembe has produced some of the best students at grade nine and twelve levels with some among the top two in the nation. The former students have an association known as MESA [Mpelembe Ex-Students Association] which has been sponsoring deserving students to do grade 10–12 at the school. Ex-Mpelembe students are scattered all over the world working for various organisations ranging from Government departments to Google.

Nkana Trust School is a trust school that provides pre-school, primary, and secondary school education. It offers the Zambian syllabus. Nkana Trust School is known for having one of the best sports and education facilities in the city and the country as a whole. Nkana trust school students produce best results in Grade 7 composite final examinations and Grade 10 and 12 final examinations. Nkana trust formally called Kitana trust has produced notable names such as Zambia's king of comedy and film director Bob Nkosha.

Elim Primary School is a small school that provides pre-school and primary school following a Zambian Standard syllabus (mainly Macmillan and Longman), and provides the basic facilities in swimming and athletics four times a week. Despite its small size, it produces one of the nation's best Grade 7 composite examination.

St. Johns Convent School is one of the largest Catholic schools in the province, a convent school that provides pre-school, primary and secondary teaching following a Zambian syllabus and providing some facilities such as athletics, swimming, basketball, rugby, football, chess, and softball. The school was founded and is run by the Sisters of John the Baptist (the Baptistines).

Kawama Pentecostal Holiness School (not to be confused with Kawama School in Kamitondo) is currently under construction by Cranleigh School in partnership with a UK charity, Beyond Ourselves. The school is located in the suburbs of Kitwe in the deprived area of Kawama. In August 2011, 17 past and present students of Cranleigh School spent two weeks laying the blocks of the 4 classroom building located adjacent to the current church building. Another Cranleigh School trip is planned for October 2011 with the aim of completing the school building and opening the new school to the 210 students (who currently all study in the single-room church building)in January 2012.

The construction work has been funded largely by the money raised in a Sponsored Walk held during the Summer of 2010 and marks the start of a long-term relationship between Cranleigh and Kawama School over the coming years. Cranleigh School is now working to develop the Child Sponsorship Programme at Kawama which will provide a salary for the staff (allowing them to complete their teaching qualifications) plus a lunch time meal and school uniform for every child. The feeding programme which provides a meal is particularly important as it not only provides employment for local women in the kitchen, but vitally it means that the children are receiving at least one square meal per day. In a region where the HIV/AIDS rate is very high, and many children are on ARV's (antiretroviral drugs), being adequately nourished is essential for this medication to work effectively.

Cranleigh School is now actively seeking to sponsor every child attending Kawama School. This is being achieved through direct appeals to parents, and through campaigns in each boarding house, who are using ingenious ways to raise the necessary funds.

Kitwe has a mining school, Konkola Trust School, that trains miners in the copperbelt; and a flying club that trains pilots near the Showgrounds. The flying club is housed in the area that was occupied by the former Kitwe airport.

Universities, Colleges and Institutes
Kitwe has three universities:

CBU (Copperbelt University) is a public university that was initially the Zambia Institute of Technology (ZIT), then part of UNZA (University of Zambia) (oddly, as University of Zambia, Ndola campus, "UNZANDO").  It was separated and established as an independent institution in 1987.  It is one of the biggest universities in the country as it has 5,000 students and 600 members of staff. The university is organised under a lifelong education directorate and ten schools namely:

School of Built Environment
School of Business
School of Engineering
Dag Hammarskjöld Institute of Peace and Conflict Studies
School of Mathematics and Natural Sciences
School of Medicine
School of Communication, Information, and Technology
School of Natural Resources
Distance Education
Graduate Studies

Copperstone University a privately owned university, located in the adjacent Luanshya District on the Ndola-Kitwe Dual Carriageway.

Zambia Catholic University a private university owned and run by the Zambia Episcopal Conference is located in Kalulushi, 15.2 km (15 minutes drive) from the city of Kitwe.

Mukuba University formerly known as Copperbelt Secondary Teachers' College (cosetco), has had the important specialized function of training teachers of Science, Mathematics and Home Economics for the nation's secondary schools, a task it has performed since it was first opened by the Ministry of Education in 1974.

The city is also home to many colleges and institutes.

KCE (Kitwe College of Education) opened in 1935 – formerly called KTTC (Kitwe Teachers' Training College) – The largest Primary teachers' College in Zambia. Currently, It offers certificates in Primary and Pre-school teachers' education. From 2011 it will start offering diploma courses in primary teachers Education.

ZIBSIP (Zambia Institute of Business Studies and Industrial Practice)-an institute that provides Business courses.

'''Kitwe Community Development Staff Training College--- A government institution, officially opened in September 1966, that provides training in Community Development

Mindolo Ecumenical Foundation

The Mindolo Ecumenical Foundation, founded in 1958, in Mindolo Township, Kitwe. Mindolo is an interdenominational center that serves as a place of worship, study, consultation and reconciliation.

The campus includes:
DMI-St. Eugene University, Kitwe centre.*
Africa Literature Center
Young Women's Christian Association
United Church of Zambia Theological College
Theological Education by Extension in Zambia (TEEZ)
St. John's Anglican Seminary
A peace training programme called "The Dag Hammarskjöld 'Messengers of Peace' Training Programme"
It used to host the "Africa Literature Centre (ALC)" a journalism school co-sponsored by churches that drew its students across African countries and the Americas. It was established in 1958, under the name All Africa Christian Literature Centre, as a pan-African institution specializing in the training of African journalists, writers and artists. Currently widely known as Africa Literature Centre for Art and Journalism Training and as Pan-African School for Journalism and Art, but closed in 1998 due to financial difficulties.

The Dag Hammarskjöld 'Messengers of Peace' Training Programme is run by the Foundation.  The objectives of this bi-annual two-week training programme are:

To spread information and knowledge of conflict resolution at different levels of society in Africa and the world;
To promote a culture of peaceful conflict resolution among people.

In addition to this two-week training programme, the Mindolo Ecumenical Foundation (MEF), which executes the programme, offers a three-month Peace Certificate covering conflict analysis, conflict resolution, human rights, training of trainers, mediation skills, restorative justice and non-violent strategies. A nine-month Peace Certificate in conflict resolution, peace-building, computer training and democracy is also offered.

Health care
Kitwe has a good health care system.

Dentist surgeries include:

Sinozam hospital
Wusakile Mine Hospital
Tejani's Surgery
Esthetix

Optical clinics include:

Kitwe central hospital (State Hospital)

Other health facilities and Hospitals include:

Wusakile Mine Hospital
Hillview Medical Centre
Company Clinic
Progress Hospital
Kitwe Central Hospital
Sinozam Hospital
Lubambe Medical Centre
Kitwe Polyclinic
Ndeke Village Hospital

Demographics

Population
According to the Kitwe City Council, Kitwe accounted for 24% of the population on the Copperbelt province as of 2019. The United Nations World Population Prospects estimated that the current metro area population of Kitwe in 2021 stood at 710,000 while the Zambia Statistics Agency had showed a much higher figure of 738,320 as of 2019.  The city hosts well over one quarter of the population of the Copperbelt province.

Religion

The majority of the population of Kitwe, about 98.5%, are Christians but there are some groups such as Muslims and Hindus. There are also some Sikhs, Jains and Jews.

Nationality
Kitwe is known for having the most Europeans of any city in Zambia. About 2% of Kitwe are Europeans, 1% are Asians, half percent are Arabs and 1.5% Africans (excluding Zambians.) When the mining actitivities started in the Copperbelt province, Luapula province, Northern province, Eastern province and Western province provided a lot of labour to the mining industry due to the fact that the indigenous Lambas were not interested in the underground work. Others came even from outside the country such as Tanzanians and Malawians joined the rest in providing labour to the industry.

Today Kitwe town has all the tribes of Zambia and non-Zambians, living and working in the Lambaland. According to the Kitwe City Council, Kitwe accounts for 24% of the population on the Copperbelt province as of 2019.

Features of Kitwe
 Obote Ave Market: arts and crafts stalls, including copper craft items.
 Copperbelt University
 Mindolo Ecumenical Foundation Campus
 Kitwe Central Hospital
 Nkana FC
 Nkana Golf Club
 Power Dynamos FC
 Kitwe United Football Club
 Arthur Davies Stadium
 Chisokone Market
 Nkana Mine
 Ek Park, a cricket ground which in 1962 played host to two first-class matches, which are to date the only first-class matches to have been played anywhere in Zambia.
 Eureka Tech Solutions Limited – The one-stop technical services company, a key player in the economy and image of the Kitwe town. Also known for services and aid to orphanages, widows, churches and support of underprivileged people/communities and organizations.

Around Kitwe

Sightseeing
The landscape around Kitwe is an attractive mix of gently undulating woodland, dambos, farmland and rivers such as the Kafue River flowing along Kitwe's eastern and southern edges.
 Mindolo Dam 7 km west of the city centre towards Kalulushi has a boating club, motorcross racing track, canoeing, table tennis, a dam, a good field for picnicking, swimming pool and bar.
 Mwekwera Falls 9 km south east just off the Kitwe-Ndola freeway, with a small lake and fish farms. The falls are small but scenic with an attractive pool below.
 Chembe Bird Sanctuary 20 km west on the Kasempa Road has a small lake surrounded by woodland and is excellent for birdwatching, fishing, camping and picnics. The shady lake shore has campsites with a communal amenities block, firewood, and water. Boats are available for hire and fishing is permitted. It is run by the Wildlife and Environmental Conservation Society of Zambia.
Kumasamba Lodge, a lodge that has a swimming pool and facilities such as fishing, picnicking and boating. There are a variety of animals that can be seen including crocodiles, pythons, cobras and monitor lizards. There is a big forest where people can move around seeing some other animals such as lions etc.

Recent development
Kitwe has three shopping malls: Copper Hill (on Kitwe-Chingola road), Mukuba Mall (in Parklands at the former Kitwe zoo location) and ECL Business Park (Freedom Park). Mukuba Mall was opened in April 2015 by the President Edgar Chagwa Lungu. Another mall is under construction in the CBD. The Freedom Park mall was slated to open in 2014, with construction starting and stopping several times. In May 2016, work resumed and in December 2018, the mall was officially opened and was renamed (named after President Edgar Chagwa Lungu).

Commercial
Kitwe is commercially rich as almost all banks in Zambia have at least one branch in Kitwe. The following banks are in Kitwe.
Access Bank
Eco Bank
Investrust Bank
Bank of China
Cavmont Capital Bank
Zanaco
Atlas Mara Bank
First National Bank
National Saving and Credit Bank
Indo-Zambia Bank
InterMarket Bank
Stanbic Bank
Standard-Chartered Bank
Absa Group Limited
Corporative Bank
First Alliance Bank
African Commercial Bank
UBA Zambia

Kitwe is home to local and international stores and restaurants, including:
Shoprite
 Pick 'n' Pay
 Game
 Hungry Lion
 Spur Steak Ranches
 Nando's
 Wimpy
 Keg and Coppersmith
Mukuba Mall is the largest shopping centre (mall).

Market
Kitwe has a variety of markets. The two major ones are:

Chisokone Market, located near Matuka Avenue, one of the largest and oldest in the city.
Obote Market, located behind Chisokone Market, has art and craft stalls including copper craft items.
Nakadoli Makert, located in Chimwemwe suburb along the Chingola road.
Chamboli Market

Known personalities
 Denise Scott Brown, American architect, planner, writer, educator.
 Jane Ohlmeyer, Irish historian.
 Richie Boucher, former Chief Executive of the Bank of Ireland. Born and raised in Kitwe to Irish parents, his father being from Dublin and his mother being from County Cavan.
 Rainford Kalaba, footballer.
 Blaaze, Hip-hop rap singer, he is from M9 Lubambe Centre a.k.a. LUBZ.
 Frederick Chiluba, 2nd President.
 Jacob Mulenga, footballer.
 Kennedy Mweene, goalkeeper of the Zambian football team.
 Zeddy Saileti, ex-footballer and football coach.
 Edgar Chagwa Lungu, 6th President of Zambia.
 Ronald Kampamba Nkana Football Club Striker.
 His Worship Christopher P Kang'ombe Current Kitwe Mayor.

Twin towns – sister cities
Kitwe's has five twin towns and sister cities:
  – Baia Mare, Romania
  – Bor, Serbia
  – Sheffield, South Yorkshire, England, United Kingdom
  – Detroit, Michigan, United States
  – Ponta Grossa, Paraná, Brasil

See also
 Railway stations in Zambia

References

External links

 Historical, vector-based map of Nkana-Kitwe, 1961
https://www.britannica.com/place/Kitwe
https://www.zambiatourism.com/towns/copperbelt/kitwe/
https://www.zambia-info.org/country/town/1325/kitwe
https://www.tripadvisor.com/Tourism-g789429-Kitwe_Copperbelt_Province-Vacations.html

 
Mining communities in Africa
Populated places in Copperbelt Province
1936 establishments in the British Empire